Stillwell is an unincorporated community in southern Richland Township, Holmes County, Ohio, United States.  Historical Stillwell Cemetery on Route 62 contains graves of early settlers, many of which farmed and logged the area.

References

Unincorporated communities in Holmes County, Ohio
Unincorporated communities in Ohio